WTNS may refer to:

 WTNS (AM), a radio station (1560 AM) licensed to Coshocton, Ohio, United States
 WTNS-FM, a radio station (99.3 FM) licensed to Coshocton, Ohio, United States